The following is a list of Saturn Award winners for Best Superhero Television Series.

The award is presented annually by the Academy of Science Fiction, Fantasy and Horror Films, honoring the work of actresses in science fiction, fantasy, and horror fiction on television. It was introduced at the 41st Saturn Awards in 2015.

Winners and nominees
The winners are listed in bold.

(NOTE: Year refers to year of eligibility, the actual ceremonies are held the following year)

2010s

Most nominations
 6 nominations – The Flash
 5 nominations – Arrow, Gotham, Supergirl
 4 nominations – Agents of S.H.I.E.L.D.
 3 nominations – Legends of Tomorrow
 2 nominations – Agent Carter, Black Lightning

Most wins
 3 wins – The Flash
 2 wins – Supergirl

See also
 Saturn Award for Best Network Television Series
 Saturn Award for Best Streaming Superhero Series

External links
 Official site
 41st, 42nd

Saturn Awards